Man and His Kingdom is a 1922 British silent adventure film directed by Maurice Elvey and starring Valia, Harvey Braban and Bertram Burleigh. It is an adaptation of The Man and His Kingdom, an 1899 novel by E. Phillips Oppenheim.

Cast
 Valia as Lucia Rimarez  
 Harvey Braban as Sagasta 
 Bertram Burleigh as Eugene Rimarez 
 Lewis Gilbert as President Rimarez  
 Gladys Jennings as Ternissa Dennison 
 M.A. Wetherell as Gregory Dane

References

Bibliography
 Palmer, Scott. British Film Actors' Credits, 1895-1987. McFarland, 1988.

External links

1922 films
1922 adventure films
British silent feature films
British adventure films
Films directed by Maurice Elvey
Stoll Pictures films
Films shot at Cricklewood Studios
Films based on British novels
British black-and-white films
1920s English-language films
1920s British films
Silent adventure films